Silvina Marcela García Larraburu (born 16 January 1969) is an Argentine politician, currently serving as a National Senator for Río Negro Province since 2013. She previously served as a National Deputy from 2011 to 2013, and as a provincial legislator in Río Negro.

Early life and education
García Larraburu was born on 16 January 1969 in San Carlos de Bariloche, to a family of Basque descent. She comes from a politically active family, and her father was active in the peronist movement, while her mother was a sympathizer of the Radical Civic Union. Her great-grandfather, Martín Larraburu, was a mayor in La Pampa.

García Larraburu counts with a degree on Public Relations from the Argentine University of Enterprise (UADE), having graduated in 1991.

Political career
García Larraburu's political career began in the Justicialist Party. From 1995 to 1999, she was director of public relations at the municipality of San Carlos de Bariloche, during the mayorship of César Miguel. She was elected to the city council of Bariloche in 2003 as part of the Front for Victory (FPV). Later, in 2007, she was elected to the legislature of Río Negro Province.

In 2011, García Larraburu was the first candidate in the Front for Victory list to the Chamber of Deputies in Río Negro; the list was the most voted, with 70.10% of the vote, and García Larraburu was elected (alongside all the other candidates in the list).

Two years after being elected as deputy, García Larraburu was the second FPV candidate to the National Senate in Río Negro in the 2013 legislative election, behind Miguel Ángel Pichetto. The FPV list was the most voted in the province, with 49.92% of the vote, and the FPV took the two seats for the majority. She originally formed part of the Front for Victory bloc, later joining most other Justicialist Party senators in breaking away and forming the Argentina Federal bloc following the 2017 legislative election. She would, eventually, return to the FPV bloc in 2018.

As senator, García Larraburu formed part of the parliamentary commissions on Administrative and Municipal Affairs, Women's Affairs, Regional Economies and Small Businesses, Science and Technology, Tourism, and Environment. Citing religious grounds, she was the sole member of the FPV bloc to vote against the 2018 Voluntary Interruption of Pregnancy bill, which would have made abortion legal in Argentina and had been approved by the lower house of Congress but was struck down by the Senate. When a similar bill was presented before the Senate again in 2020, García Larraburu changed her position and voted in favour of the measure, stating she had understood the issue of abortion was "beyond [her] personal beliefs", instead deserving the treatment of a "public health issue."

She was re-elected for a second term in 2019, as the second candidate in the Frente de Todos (FDT) list, behind Martín Doñate. The list was the most voted, with 50.46% of the vote, granting the FDT the two majority seats.

References

External links

  (in Spanish)

1969 births
Living people
People from Bariloche
Argentine people of Basque descent
Members of the Argentine Senate for Río Negro
Members of the Argentine Chamber of Deputies elected in Río Negro
Members of the Legislature of Río Negro
Women members of the Argentine Senate
Women members of the Argentine Chamber of Deputies
Justicialist Party politicians
21st-century Argentine politicians
21st-century Argentine women politicians